Ogden's Landing was a steamboat landing and woodyard, owned by former Colorado River ferry partner of George Alonzo Johnson, supplying wood to the steamboats on the lower Colorado River in Sonora, Mexico, from the mid 1854 to the late 1870s. Ogden's Landing was located 28 miles above Gridiron and 24 miles below Pedrick's in Sonora until 1856, when it became part of New Mexico Territory, until it became Arizona Territory in 1863. Ogden's Landing lay along the east bank of the river 19 miles below what is now the Sonora - Arizona border.

References

External links
 DavidRumsey.com: "Geological Map No. 1." Prepared by J.S. Newberry, M.D. Geologist to the Expedition. — Explorations and Surveys of U.S. War Department, "Map No. 1. Rio Colorado of the West" explored by 1st Lieut. Joseph C. Ives, Topl. Engrs. under the direction of the Office of Explorations and Surveys. A.A. Humphreys, Capt. Topl. Engrs. in Charge, by 1858 order of the Hon. John B. Floyd, Secretary of War. — Drawn by Frhr. F.W.v. Egloffstein. Topographer to the Expedition. Topography by Frhr. F.W.v. Egloffstein. Ruling by Samuel Sartain. Lettering by F. Courtenay. 1858.

Former populated places in San Luis Río Colorado Municipality, Sonora
Communities in the Lower Colorado River Valley
Steamboat transport on the Colorado River
Populated places established in 1854
1854 establishments in Mexico